Auküla is a village in Haljala Parish, Lääne-Viru County, in northern Estonia. As of 2011 Census, the settlement's population was 59.

In 1861 a local 3-grade school started operating in Auküla. But in 1930 it was closed due to economical crises. Nowadays the schoolhouse is used as a residential building. In 1996 a memorial stone was erected in front of the house.

References

Villages in Lääne-Viru County